Gorodishchensky District is the name of several administrative and municipal districts in Russia.
Gorodishchensky District, Penza Oblast, an administrative and municipal district of Penza Oblast
Gorodishchensky District, Volgograd Oblast, an administrative and municipal district of Volgograd Oblast

See also
Gorodishchensky (disambiguation)
Gorodishche (disambiguation)

References